Kot Sarang is a village and union council of Pakistan, an administrative subdivision, of the Chakwal District in the Punjab Province of Pakistan, it is part of Talagang Tehsil.

References

Union councils of Chakwal District
Populated places in Chakwal District